Marasmarcha brevirostris is a species of moth in the genus Marasmarcha known from Guatemala, Mexico, and Panama. Moths of this species take flight in February and August and have a wingspan of approximately 20–25 millimetres.

References

Exelastini
Moths described in 1915